Yesstory is a double CD and triple LP career-spanning distillation of music by progressive rock band Yes that had originally appeared on the 1991 box set Yesyears. Yesstory was issued in 1992 lacking the rarity material that had characterized its parent release, although it does contain "Make It Easy", previously only released on Yesyears.

Yesstory is still available, although Yesyears was deleted and replaced by the 2002 Rhino Records box set In a Word: Yes (1969 - ).

Track listing (CD version)

Yesstory (Atco 792 202) failed to chart in the U.S. or UK.

Track listing (vinyl version)
The vinyl version has a slightly different running order and a reduced track listing due to time constraints. This version has also been released as a double CD; with LP 1 and the first side of LP 2 making up disc one and the second side of LP 2 and LP 3 making up disc two:

References

Albums with cover art by Roger Dean (artist)
Albums produced by Trevor Horn
Albums produced by Trevor Rabin
Albums produced by Eddy Offord
Yes (band) compilation albums
1992 compilation albums
Atlantic Records compilation albums